LeFlore County is a county along the eastern border of the U.S state of Oklahoma. As of the 2010 census, the population was 50,384. Its county seat is Poteau. The county is part of the Fort Smith metropolitan area and the name honors a Choctaw family named LeFlore. The United States District Court for the Eastern District of Oklahoma is the federal district court with jurisdiction in LeFlore County.

History
The Choctaw Nation signed the Treaty of Doak's Stand in 1820, ceding part of their ancestral home in the Southeastern U. S. and receiving a large tract in Indian Territory. They signed the Treaty of Dancing Rabbit Creek in 1830, which ceded the remainder of their original homeland. Most of the remainder of the Choctaw were removed to Indian Territory, escorted by federal military troops, in several waves.

The town of Skullyville developed around the agency. It was designated as county seat of Skullyville County, the capital of the Moshulatubbee District of which Skullyville County was a part, and the national capital of the Choctaw Nation.

The US Indian agents lived in the town. In the late 1850s, it was designated as a stage stop (Walker's Station) for the Butterfield Overland Mail route.

In 1834, the U. S. Army built Fort Coffee a few miles north of Skullyville, but reassigned the garrison after four years. The Methodist Church took over the facility, converting it for use as the Fort Coffee Academy for Boys, a missionary school. That church also established the New Hope Seminary for Girls in 1845, just east of town. In 1847, the Choctaw Agency burned and its functions were transferred to Fort Washita.

During the Civil War, the Choctaw allied with the Confederacy and many of their men served in its army. The Battle of Devil's Backbone was fought near the present town of Pocola on September 1, 1863. Union Major General James G. Blunt defeated Confederate Brigadier General William Cabell. Union troops burned the Fort Coffee Academy in 1863, because it was being used to house Confederate troops.

In 1866, the Choctaw government reopened New Hope Seminary, but never rebuilt a boys academy. New Hope Seminary operated until it burned in 1896. The first school for Choctaw freedmen opened at Boggy Depot. In 1892, the Tushkalusa (black warriors) Freedmen Boarding school opened three miles southeast of Talihina.

From 1886, development of coal mining and timber production attracted considerable railroad construction: the Choctaw, Oklahoma and Gulf Railroad built tracks from Wister west to McAlester. In 1898, the company extended the line east from Wister to Howe, continuing the line to Arkansas in 1899. (This line was leased to the Chicago, Rock Island and Pacific Railway in 1904).

In 1896 the Kansas City, Pittsburg and Gulf Railroad (acquired by the Kansas City Southern Railway in 1900) built tracks through the region from north to south, exiting into Arkansas near the Page community in southern LeFlore County. In 1900-01 the Poteau Valley Railroad built a line from Shady Point to Sutter (later known as Calhoun, which they abandoned in 1926. Also in 1900-01 the Arkansas Western Railroad constructed tracks from Heavener east to Arkansas. In 1901 the Fort Smith and Western Railroad connected Coal Creek west to McCurtain in Haskell County. In 1903-04 the Midland Valley Railroad laid tracks from Arkansas west through Bokoshe to Muskogee. The Oklahoma and Rich Mountain Railroad, owned by the Dierks Lumber and Coal Company, constructed the county's last railroad, from Page to the lumber town of Pine Valley in 1925–26.

Prior to statehood, the area that became LeFlore County was part of Moshulatubbee and the Apukshunnubbee districts. Its present-day territory fell primarily within Nashoba, Skullyville, Sugar Loaf, and Wade counties, with small portions falling within Cedar and San Bois counties, in the Choctaw Nation.

Robert S. Kerr, former Governor of Oklahoma and U.S. Senator, established a ranch outside Poteau in the 1950s. In 1978 the family donated this residence to the state. It was adapted and opened for use as the Kerr Conference Center and Museum. The Kerr Center for Sustainable Agriculture and the Overstreet-Kerr Historical Farm are also in the county.

Geography

The Arkansas River forms the northern boundary of the county, while its tributaries, the Poteau and James Fork rivers drain much of the county into the Arkansas. The Kiamichi, Little and Mountain Fork rivers drain the rest of the county into the Red River of the South. The Ouachita Mountains extend into the southern part of the county, along with associated ranges: the Winding Stair Mountains and the Kiamichi Mountains. Cavanal Hill is partly in the northern part of the county.

Natural attractions
Lake Wister, a flood control reservoir, is in the central part of the county, formed behind . The Ouachita National Forest, in the county's southern half, and Heavener Runestone State Park are tourist attractions.

Additionally, Winding Stair Mountain National Recreation Area is located in the county. It is one of two National Recreation Areas located in the state of Oklahoma, the other being Chickasaw.

Major highways

  U.S. Highway 59
  U.S. Highway 259
  U.S. Highway 270
  U.S. Highway 271
  State Highway 1
  State Highway 9
  State Highway 31
  State Highway 63

Adjacent counties

 Sequoyah County (north)
 Sebastian County, Arkansas (northeast)
 Scott County, Arkansas (east)
 Polk County, Arkansas (southeast)
 McCurtain County (south)
 Pushmataha County (southwest)
 Latimer County (west)
 Haskell County (northwest)

National protected areas
 Indian Nations National Wildlife and Scenic Area
 Ouachita National Forest (part)
 Winding Stair Mountain National Recreation Area
 Spiro Mounds

Demographics

As of the census of 2000, there were 48,109 people, 17,861 households, and 13,199 families residing in the county. There were 20,142 housing units at an average density of 13 per square mile (5/km2). The racial makeup of the county was 80.35% White, 2.21% Black or African American, 10.72% Native American, 0.21% Asian, 0.03% Pacific Islander, 1.44% from other races, and 5.03% from two or more races. 3.84% of the population were Hispanic or Latino of any race. 22.7 were of American, 10.1% Irish, 9.6% German and 7.7% English ancestry.

There were 17,861 households, out of which 33.40% had children under the age of 18 living with them, 58.50% were married couples living together, 11.00% had a female householder with no husband present, and 26.10% were non-families. 23.10% of all households were made up of individuals, and 10.90% had someone living alone who was 65 years of age or older. The average household size was 2.61 and the average family size was 3.05.

In the county, the population was spread out, with 26.10% under the age of 18, 9.70% from 18 to 24, 27.00% from 25 to 44, 23.30% from 45 to 64, and 13.80% who were 65 years of age or older. The median age was 36 years. For every 100 females, there were 99.30 males. For every 100 females age 18 and over, there were 97.80 males.

The median income for a household in the county was $27,278, and the median income for a family was $32,603. Males had a median income of $26,214 versus $19,792 for females. The per capita income for the county was $13,737. About 15.40% of families and 19.10% of the population were below the poverty line, including 24.10% of those under age 18 and 16.50% of those age 65 or over.

Politics

Communities

Cities
 Heavener
 Poteau (county seat)

Towns

 Arkoma
 Bokoshe
 Cameron
 Cowlington
 Fanshawe (partly in Latimer County)
 Fort Coffee
 Howe
 LeFlore, Oklahoma
 Page
 Panama
 Pocola
 Rock Island
 Shady Point
 Spiro
 Talihina
 Wister

Census-designated places
 Monroe
 Whitesboro

Other unincorporated communities
 Big Cedar
 Hodgen
 Milton
 Muse
 Octavia
 Skullyville

NRHP sites

The following sites in LeFlore County are listed on the National Register of Historic Places:

References

 
1907 establishments in Oklahoma
Populated places established in 1907
Fort Smith metropolitan area